Kang Hye-Mi (born April 27, 1974 in Busan) is a female volleyball player.
Playing as a setter she was one of the key players of the Women's National Team during the 1990s and the early 2000s (decade). 

She represented South Korea at three consecutive Summer Olympics (1996, 2000 and 2004), and the 2001 FIVB World Grand Prix, and 2003 FIVB Women's World Cup

Kang retired in 2004, after then she became a high school teacher.

Honours
 1994 FIVB World Grand Prix — 5th place
 1994 World Championship — 4th place
 1996 FIVB World Grand Prix — 6th place
 1996 Olympic Games — 6th place
 1997 FIVB World Grand Prix — 3rd place
 1997 World Grand Champions Cup — 6th place
 1997 Asian Championship — 2nd place
 1998 FIVB World Grand Prix — 6th place
 1998 World Championship — 9th place
 1999 FIVB World Grand Prix — 6th place
 1999 FIVB World Cup — 4th place
 1999 Asian Championship — 2nd place
 2000 FIVB World Grand Prix — 5th place
 2000 Olympic Games — 8th place
 2001 FIVB World Grand Prix — 7th place
 2002 World Championship — 6th place
 2003 FIVB World Cup — 9th place
 2004 Olympic Qualification Tournament — 2nd place (qualified)
 2004 Olympic Games — 5th place

References

External links
 FIVB Profile
 Athens 2004

1974 births
Living people
South Korean women's volleyball players
Volleyball players at the 1996 Summer Olympics
Volleyball players at the 2000 Summer Olympics
Volleyball players at the 2004 Summer Olympics
Olympic volleyball players of South Korea
Asian Games medalists in volleyball
Volleyball players at the 1994 Asian Games
Volleyball players at the 1998 Asian Games
Volleyball players at the 2002 Asian Games
Asian Games gold medalists for South Korea
Asian Games silver medalists for South Korea
Medalists at the 1994 Asian Games
Medalists at the 1998 Asian Games
Medalists at the 2002 Asian Games
Sportspeople from Busan